is a Japanese long-distance runner. In 2019, he competed in the men's marathon at the 2019 World Athletics Championships held in Doha, Qatar. He finished in 25th place.

In 2013, he competed in the men's half marathon event at the 2013 Summer Universiade held in Kazan, Russia. He finished in 4th place and he won the silver medal in the team event.

In 2018, he finished in 17th place in the 2018 Tokyo Marathon in Tokyo, Japan.

References

External links 
 

Living people
1991 births
Place of birth missing (living people)
Japanese male long-distance runners
Japanese male marathon runners
World Athletics Championships athletes for Japan
Competitors at the 2013 Summer Universiade
Universiade medalists in athletics (track and field)
Universiade silver medalists for Japan
20th-century Japanese people
21st-century Japanese people